Arne Leonhard Nilsen  (21 July 1893 – 5 April 1957) was a Norwegian politician.

He was born in Kristiansand to merchant Nikolai Emil Nilsen and Anne Lovise Aarrestad. He was elected representative to the Storting for the period 1954–1957 for the Conservative Party.

References

1893 births
1957 deaths
Politicians from Kristiansand
Conservative Party (Norway) politicians
Members of the Storting